Alanson is a village in Emmet County in the U.S. state of Michigan.  The population was 778 at the 2020 census.

Alanson is in Littlefield Township on U.S. Highway 31 at the junction with M-68.

Alanson was first settled in 1875.  The Alanson post office opened with the name Hinman on January 17, 1877, and changed to Alanson on June 22, 1882.

Attractions 

Located on the Crooked River, Alanson is part of the Inland Water Route, which includes: Crooked, Burt and Mullett lakes, and the Crooked, Indian and Cheboygan rivers. The Inland Water Route Historical Society Museum is located in Alanson.

Alanson also has a hillside garden located adjacent to the former Grand Rapids and Indiana Railroad depot. The village has added a nice library in the community center.  Both the town and the Crooked River are mentioned in a song title on the Sufjan Stevens album, Michigan.

Geography

Demographics

2010 census
As of the census of 2010, there were 738 people, 307 households, and 209 families residing in the village. The racial makeup of the village was 92.4% White, 5.0% Native American, 0.3% Asian, and 2.3% from two or more races. Hispanic or Latino of any race were 1.4% of the population.

There were 307 households, of which 33.9% had children under the age of 18 living with them, 48.2% were married couples living together, 14.3% had a female householder with no husband present, 5.5% had a male householder with no wife present, and 31.9% were non-families. 27.0% of all households were made up of individuals, and 6.6% had someone living alone who was 65 years of age or older. The average household size was 2.40 and the average family size was 2.83.

The median age in the village was 36.3 years. 25.1% of residents were under the age of 18; 8.5% were between the ages of 18 and 24; 28.7% were from 25 to 44; 26.1% were from 45 to 64; and 11.7% were 65 years of age or older. The gender makeup of the village was 50.4% male and 49.6% female.

2000 census
As of the census of 2000, there were 785 people, 323 households, and 207 families residing in the village. The racial makeup of the village was 89.55% White, 0.89% African American, 5.61% Native American, 0.13% Asian, 0.51% from other races, and 3.31% from two or more races. Hispanic or Latino of any race were 1.02% of the population.

There were 323 households, out of which 31.6% had children under the age of 18 living with them, 48.3% were married couples living together, 11.8% had a female householder with no husband present, and 35.9% were non-families. 29.4% of all households were made up of individuals, and 10.2% had someone living alone who was 65 years of age or older.  The average household size was 2.43 and the average family size was 2.93.

In the village, the population was spread out, with 26.9% under the age of 18, 10.2% from 18 to 24, 33.1% from 25 to 44, 19.0% from 45 to 64, and 10.8% who were 65 years of age or older.  The median age was 33 years. For every 100 females, there were 95.8 males.  For every 100 females age 18 and over, there were 93.3 males.

The median income for a household in the village was $33,125, and the median income for a family was $38,333. Males had a median income of $23,929 versus $20,568 for females. The per capita income for the village was $20,703.  About 4.0% of families and 8.1% of the population were below the poverty line, including 5.7% of those under age 18 and 15.0% of those age 65 or over.

Education
 Alanson Public Schools

References

Notes

Sources

Villages in Emmet County, Michigan
Villages in Michigan
Populated places established in 1875
1875 establishments in Michigan